Bangladesh Championship League (BCL) is the second-tier football league of Bangladesh run by the Bangladesh Football Federation. It was founded in 2012. The league is also known as TVS Championship League for sponsorship agreements from 2018–19.

History
Bangladesh Football Federation (BFF) introduced the country's first professional football league in 2007. The 2nd tier professional league began with the 2012 season of Premier League. BFF introduced the second-tier league in 2012 as season 5 of Premier League was commencing.

List of winners
Champions so far are:

Performances by club
Performance in the Bangladesh Championship League by clubs

As of the end of 2021-22 season.

Stats and players

Top Goalscorer

Clubs and locations

The following 11 clubs have competed in the Bangladesh Championship League during the 2022–23 season.

Brothers Union
BFF Elite Football Academy
Fortis FC Academy
Gopalganj Sporting Club
Dhaka Wanderers Club
Fakirerpool Young Men's Club
Little Friends Club
NoFeL Sporting Club
Swadhinata KS
Uttara FC
Wari Club

The venues for the current season are:-
 Bir Sherestha Shaheed Shipahi Mostafa Kamal Stadium, Dhaka

Sponsorship
Here is the list of sponsors of BCL since its inception:

See also
 Sheikh Kamal International Club Cup
 Bangladesh Premier League
 Federation Cup

References

External links
Bangladesh Football Federation

 
2
Professional sports leagues in Bangladesh
Bangladesh
Sports leagues established in 2012
2012 establishments in Bangladesh